Carex straminiformis is a species of sedge known by the common name Shasta sedge.

Description
Carex straminiformis produces dense clumps of stems 20 to 50 centimeters tall with leaves up to about 25 centimeters long. The inflorescence is a dense spherical brown cluster of distinct flower spikes.

Distribution and habitat
This sedge is native to the Western United States where it grows in a number of habitat types in rocky soils, such as in the Sierra Nevada and Mount Shasta regions.

References

External links
Jepson Manual Treatment - Carex straminiformis
Carex straminiformis - Photo gallery

straminiformis
Flora of the Northwestern United States
Flora of Nevada
Flora of Utah
Flora of the Sierra Nevada (United States)
Flora of the California desert regions
Flora of the Great Basin
Natural history of Shasta County, California
Plants described in 1889
Flora without expected TNC conservation status
Taxa named by Liberty Hyde Bailey